Víktor Shekhotsev (23 April 1940 – 1 February 2015) was a Soviet association football midfielder and Ukrainian coach.

References

External links
 Мастер спорта СССР Виктор Шеховцев: Слова о чести города и "Судостроителя" для нас не были пустым звуком
 

1940 births
2015 deaths
Soviet footballers
MFC Mykolaiv managers
MFC Mykolaiv players
FC Khimik-Arsenal players
PFC Krylia Sovetov Samara players
FC Metalist Kharkiv players
Footballers from Moscow
Ukrainian football managers
Association football midfielders